Thomas Page McBee (born 1981) is an American transgender journalist, television writer, and amateur boxer. He was the first transgender man to box in Madison Square Garden, which he discusses in Amateur. His first book, Man Alive, won a Lambda Literary Award for Transgender Nonfiction.

Personal life 
McBee was born in Hickory, North Carolina, in 1981 and grew up outside of Pittsburgh.

McBee has noted that he "knew [he] wasn't a girl before [he] knew much of anything." However, he also did not resonate with men's "jockeying power dynamics or aversion to hugs." Although he decided in college that he did not want to take hormones, his breasts caused him stress, so in his twenties, he opted for top surgery. After the surgery, he decided he was neither a man nor a woman. However, two years later, he realized that although he "didn't connect with the cultural expectations of Being a Man, [he] knew that [he]'d grown up and become one." He began hormone replacement therapy when he was 30 years old and at 31, he received a new birth certificate from North Carolina Vital Records, an experience he described as feeling like he had been "born again".

McBee currently lives in Los Angeles with his wife, Jessica Bloom.

Career 
Aside from writing, McBee was a senior editor at Quartz and taught at City University of New York.

He has also served as an advisor at West Virginia University's Graduate School of Journalism.

Writing 
McBee has written regular columns in The Rumpus ("Self-Made Man"), Them ("Amateur"), Bitch, and Pacific Standard ("The American Man"). His writing has also appeared in The New York Times, Teen Vogue, Glamour, Playboy, The Atlantic, VICE, and other publications.

TV 
In 2019 and 2020, McBee wrote episodes for Netflix's Tales of the City and Showtime's The L Word: Generation Q. He has also appeared on the documentary film No Ordinary Man and the mini-series The Art of Intersection.

In 2021, McBee was a supervising producer onThe Umbrella Academy, where he architected a storyline in which Elliot Page's character transitions to male, mirroring the actor's real-world transition.

He is currently working on a television adaptation for Amateur.

Amateur (2018) 

Amateur: A True Story About What Makes a Man was published August 14, 2018, by Scribner.

The book received a starred review from Publishers Weekly, as well as positive reviews from Kirkus, The New Republic, Buzzfeed, Booklist, The Rumpus, The Guardian, Los Angeles Review of Books, and Shelf Awareness.

Amateur was a finalist for a Lambda Literary Award for Transgender Nonfiction, nominated for The Baillie Gifford Prize for Non-Fiction, and shortlisted for the Wellcome Book Prize.

Man Alive (2014) 

Man Alive: A True Story of Violence, Forgiveness and Becoming a Man was published September 9, 2014, by City Lights Publishers.

The book received starred reviews from Publishers Weekly, Kirkus Reviews, Lambda Literary Foundation, and Library Journal.

Man Alive won a Lambda Literary Award for Transgender Nonfiction.

Awards

References

External links 

 Official website

Living people
Year of birth unknown
Lambda Literary Award winners
1981 births
Writers from North Carolina
West Virginia University faculty
Transgender men
Transgender writers
LGBT people from North Carolina
Transgender sportsmen
American LGBT sportspeople
Boxers from North Carolina